MS Stena Superfast VIII is a fast Ro-Pax ferry owned and operated by Stena Line between Belfast and Cairnryan. The ship was built in 2001 by Howaldtswerke-Deutsche Werft (HDW), Kiel, Germany for Attica Group's subsidiary Superfast Ferries. She was sold to her current owners in 2017.

In March 2006 Superfast sold its Baltic Sea operations to Tallink. Like her sisters, the Superfast VIII was moved from Finnish to Estonian registry, and her route changed to Hanko–Paldiski–Rostock from April 2006 onwards. The call at Paldiski proved to be impractical, and already in June of the same year the route reverted to Hanko–Rostock. Around this time the ship's hull markings were changed to "Superfast operated by Tallink". Although there were rumours that the ships would be moved under Silja Line's brand from January 2007 onwards, they were instead officially made a part of Tallink's fleet. At the same time their route changed to Tallinn–Helsinki–Rostock. Between 5 and 12 April 2007 the ship was used on the Helsinki–Tallinn route due to a delay in the delivery of the new MS Star. After this she joined her sisters in the Rostock service.

Stena Line charter 

In March 2011, Stena Line announced it would be chartering the Superfast VIII and sister ship Superfast VII. The vessels now operate on crossings of the North Channel separating Ireland and Britain; between Belfast and Cairnryan, at a new facility built by Stena Line called Loch Ryan Port. in February 2014, Stena renewed the charter of these ships until Autumn 2019.  Stena Superfast VIII has been voted the top ship in the entire Stena Line fleet by Stena customers for both 2013 and 2014. More recently the ship has been voted top ship in both the Irish Sea fleet and the entire Stena fleet.

Conversion to day ferries 
Before the two sisters entered service for Stena Line, an extensive refurbishment/conversion overseen by Stena Ro-Ro and Knud E Hansen was undertaken at the Remontowa Shipyard in Gdańsk, Poland.  This was rumoured at the time to have cost a total of €14M.  As part of this conversion, the free height of the upper vehicle deck was raised to 5.05 m allowing Stena to carry full height freight.  Both ships also received an additional bow thruster to improve manoeuvrability, taking their complement to 3 bow thrusters and 1 stern thruster.  As the new port in Scotland had a TTS automated mooring system installed, the ships were also adapted to work with this by adding 3 steel bollards on the starboard side bow.

Refurbishment

During March 2015, some areas of Stena Superfast VIII were refurbished whilst the ship was dry docked at Harland and Wolff. Along with the entire Irish sea fleet (1 ship at a time), Superfast VIII will enter dry dock in April 2023 for extensive work to both the exterior and to the passenger accommodation, this dock will take place in Liverpool.

Other information 

Stena Superfast VIII is managed by Stena Line as of March 2023. Stena Line purchased the vessel in December 2017.

References

External links
 M/S Superfast VIII at Fakta om Fartyg (in Swedish)
 Superfast VIII at marinetraffic.com
 Stena Superfast VII and VIII at NIFerrysite.co.uk

Ferries of Estonia
Ferries of Finland
Ferries of Northern Ireland
Ships built in Kiel
2000 ships
Superfast 8
08